Phaeochrous is a genus of beetles belonging to the family Hybosoridae. The species are widely distributed over tropical Africa, Madagascar, Aldabra, Yemen, South Asia, South-East Asia, New Guinea and Oceanian islands, as well as North and West Australia.

Description
Body length is approximately 8 to 17 mm. Eyes normally developed. Pronotum glabrous. Elytra striate, without longitudinal carenae. Male is yellowish brown, via dark reddish brown, to nearly black. Margins of the head, pronotum and elytra lighter, or more reddish whereas the ventrum is about reddish to dark brown. Labrum anteriorly emarginate, with a row of long, erect setae along its fore margin. Anterior margin of clypeus is concave. Gena rounded and protruding laterally beyond eye, and clothed with a conspicuous tuft of yellowish, erect setae. Pronotum disc with double isodiametric punctation and often a faint median longitudinal band is visible. Anterior margin of pronotum is bisinuate, whereas the base is bisinuate. Elytra completely glabrous or with sparse, hardly discernible, short, erect setae in apical area. Elytral surface with around 16 to 18 striae, composed of round to quadrangular punctures. Mandibles are more or less strongly protruding beyond labrum. Parameres are strongly asymmetric. Females with less wide to hardly present lateral deplanations in pronotum. Elytral setae of lateral fringe much shorter. Mandibles much less to hardly protruding beyond labrum, and evenly rounded.

Species
 Phaeochrous amplus Arrow, 1909
 Phaeochrous australicus Kuijten, 1978
 Phaeochrous beccarii Harold, 1871
 Phaeochrous behrensii Horn, 1867
 Phaeochrous bicarinatus Kuijten, 1986
 Phaeochrous borealis Kuijten, 1984
 Phaeochrous burgoblitus Kuijten, 1986
 Phaeochrous camerunensis Arrow, 1909
 Phaeochrous compactus Kuijten, 1978
 Phaeochrous davaonis Kuijten, 1981
 Phaeochrous dispar Quedenfeldt, 1884
 Phaeochrous dissimilis Arrow, 1909
 Phaeochrous diversipes Pic, 1928
 Phaeochrous dubius (Westwood, 1845)
 Phaeochrous elevatus Kuijten, 1978
 Phaeochrous emarginatus Castelnau, 1840
 Phaeochrous enigmaticus Kuijten, 1978
 Phaeochrous gambiensis (Westwood, 1841)
 Phaeochrous gigas Schouteden, 1918
 Phaeochrous hainanensis Zhang, 1990
 Phaeochrous indicus (Westwood, 1845)
 Phaeochrous intermedius Pic, 1928
 Phaeochrous lobatus Kuijten, 1978
 Phaeochrous madagascariensis (Westwood, 1845)
 Phaeochrous madrassicus Kuijten, 1978
 Phaeochrous nicolasi Keith, 2002
 Phaeochrous nitidus Arrow, 1909
 Phaeochrous orbachi Keith & Ballerio, 2019
 Phaeochrous philippinensis (Westwood, 1841)
 Phaeochrous pletus Kuijten, 1978
 Phaeochrous portuum Kuijten, 1978
 Phaeochrous pseudintermedius Kuijten, 1978
 Phaeochrous rhodesianus Schouteden, 1918
 Phaeochrous rudis Kuijten, 1984
 Phaeochrous ruficollis Fairmaire, 1893
 Phaeochrous rufus Pic, 1928
 Phaeochrous schoutedeni Burgeon, 1928
 Phaeochrous senegalensis Castelnau, 1840
 Phaeochrous separabilis Zhang, 1990
 Phaeochrous stupendus Kuijten, 1986
 Phaeochrous sulawesi Kuijten, 1978
 Phaeochrous tanzanianus Tagliaferri, 2002
 Phaeochrous tertiarium (Deichmüller, 1881)
 Phaeochrous tokaraensis Nomura, 1961
 Phaeochrous tonkineus Pic, 1943
 Phaeochrous tumbanus Burgeon, 1928
 Phaeochrous turcanicola Kuijten, 1986
 Phaeochrous uelensis Burgeon, 1928
 Phaeochrous usambarae Burgeon, 1928

References

Scarabaeoidea genera